Claudius de Cap Blanc (1 November 1953 – 11 November 2022), pseudonym of Jean-Claude Lagarde, was a French sculptor. He was known as a "vulvographer" for his paintings and engravings of the human vulva.

Biography
Lagarde was born in Oust, Ariège on 1 November 1953 into a peasant family. His name was a replacement for his deceased older brother, also Jean-Claude, after his death at 22 months of age from gangrene. He was found dead on 11 November 2022 in Ganac from a self-inflicted gunshot wound, at the age of 69.

Works
Art affabulatoire (1994–2006)
Redresseur de torts
L'Inverseur de tendance
Frein à dépense
Règle de conduite
Réconciliateur
Pèse-mot
Semoir “à tout vent”'Machine à verser dans le tragiqueL'Auto-aliénateurL'AmidonnoirLe Sèche-larmeLe MaïeutiqueurLa Roue à mouvement perpétuelLa Machine à joindre les deux boutsIn 2007, Lagarde began devoting himself to vulvography, painting and engraving on the rocks and trees of the Ariège Pyrenees and in public place. The lack of authorization of these works led to his prosecution for vandalism, for which he was fined 6000 euros and sentenced to two months in prison. His sentence was followed by a conference at the  put on by prehistorian Jean Clottes.

Radio

Film
In 2021, Lagarde was the subject of the documentary À l'aube du vulvolithique, directed by Fabrice Leroy and first shown at the Cinéma Le Casino.

TelevisionÉclats de rue (1994)TF1 20 heures (1995)JT Toulouse Soir (1995)Vent Sud Pyrénées (1996)Alice Pyrénées France 3 (1998)Vent Sud Pyrénées (1998)Demain c’est dimanche, Pyrénées (1998)Magazine 12-14 (2001)JT Toulouse midi 15 minutes, Pyrénées (2003)Les dossiers de France 3, Pyrénées (2003)JT Toulouse midi, Pyrénées (2005)Midi pile Midi Pyrénées (2011)JT Toulouse soir, Pyrénées (2011)12-13 édition Midi-Pyrénées (2016)

PublicationsLe Premier Testament des Mangphus (2017)La Vulve et ses proscrits (2018)L'ère vulvolithique (2018)L'Ère Vulvolithique (2018)La Somme Vulvographique (2018)La Première lettre (2018)À la Recherche du Temps Lithique (2018)Le Signe de a Vulve (2019)Le Vulvificat (2021)Vulvoglyphes (2021)Gynéçance'' (2021)

References

1953 births
2022 deaths
2022 suicides
20th-century French sculptors
21st-century French sculptors
People from Ariège (department)
Suicides by firearm in France